The Snitching Hour is a 1922 American silent comedy film directed by Alan Crosland and starring Arthur Housman, Gladys Leslie, and Nita Naldi.

Cast
 Arthur Housman as Bunny 
 Gladys Leslie as Lois Dickerson 
 Frank Currier as Mr. Dickerson 
 Nita Naldi as The 'Countess' 
 George Lessey as Larry
 Mario Carillo

References

Bibliography
 Monaco, James. The Encyclopedia of Film. Perigee Books, 1991.

External links

1922 films
Silent American comedy films
Films directed by Alan Crosland
American silent feature films
American black-and-white films
1922 comedy films
1920s American films